Michael E. Lynch (born 17 October 1948),  is an emeritus professor at the department of Science and Technology Studies at Cornell University. His works are particularly concerned with ethnomethodological approaches in science studies. Much of his research has addressed the role of visual representation in scientific practice.

From 2002-2012 he was the editor of Social Studies of Science. In 2016, he won the Society for Social Studies of Science's J. D. Bernal Prize for distinguished contributions to the field.

Awards
 1995 Robert K. Merton Professional award, Science, Knowledge and Technology Section of the American Sociological Association
 2011 Distinguished Publication Award, Ethnomethodology/Conversation Analysis Section of the American Sociological Association
 2016 John Desmond Bernal Prize
 2020 Garfinkel-Sacks Award for Distinguished Scholarship, Ethnomethodology/Conversation Analysis Section of the American Sociological Association

Selected bibliography

Books

Book chapters

Journal articles

References

External links
 Lynch's Cornell profile page
 Radical Ethnomethodology workshop organized by Lynch

1948 births
American sociologists
Cornell University faculty
Living people